Ferdinand Philippe Marie d'Orléans, duc d'Alençon (12 July 1844 – 29 June 1910) was the son of Louis Charles Philippe Raphael d'Orléans, Duke of Nemours and Princess Victoria of Saxe-Coburg and Gotha (a first cousin of Britain's Queen Victoria).

Early life

Prince Ferdinand of Orléans was born on 12 July 1844.  He was the son of Prince Louis, Duke of Nemours, and Princess Victoria of Saxe-Coburg and Gotha, cousin of Queen Victoria.  Among his siblings was older brother Prince Gaston of Orleans, Count of Eu, the Imperial consort of Brazil (through his marriage to Isabel, Princess Imperial of Brazil), and younger sister Princess Marguerite Adélaïde of Orléans, wife of Prince Władysław Czartoryski.

His paternal grandparents were Maria Amalia of Naples and Sicily, Queen consort of the French, and King Louis Philippe, who was forced to abdicate after the outbreak of the French Revolution of 1848. 

His maternal grandparents were Prince Ferdinand of Saxe-Coburg and Gotha and Princess Maria Antonia Koháry.

Personal life
On 28 September 1868, he married Sophie Charlotte Augustine, Duchess in Bavaria (1847–1897) at Possenhofen Castle, near Starnberg.  Sophie, the ninth of ten children born to Duke Maximilian Joseph in Bavaria and Princess Ludovika of Bavaria, was a sister of Empress Elisabeth of Austria, Queen Maria Sophie of the Two Sicilies, and Duchess Mathilde Ludovika in Bavaria, the wife of Neapolitan Prince Luis of the Two Sicilies.  Before their marriage, she had been engaged to King Ludwig II of Bavaria, but the King called off the engagement before the marriage.  The year after their marriage, the ducal couple moved into Bushy House in the Teddington area of Southwest London. The couple had two children:

 Louise d'Orléans (1869–1952), who married Prince Alfons of Bavaria (1862–1933) and had children.
 Emmanuel d'Orléans (1872–1931), duke of Vendôme, who married Princess Henriette of Belgium (1870–1948) and had children.

His wife died in a fire at the Bazar de la Charité in Paris on 4 May 1897. He died in Wimbledon on 29 June 1910. He was buried at the Chapelle royale de Dreux, the Orléans family necropolis.

Ancestry

Orders and decorations
 : Knight of the Order of Saint Hubert, 1868

References

1844 births
1910 deaths
Ferdinand
Burials at the Chapelle royale de Dreux
601